Jimmy Adar (born 1 November 1987 in Lira) is a Ugandan middle-distance runner. He has represented his country at the Commonwealth Games twice, running in the heats at the 2006 Commonwealth Games before going on to finish fifth in the final of the 800 metres at the 2010 Commonwealth Games. He has also competed at the African Games in 2007 and 2015, the African Championships in Athletics in 2008 and 2010, and was a bronze medallist at the 2005 African Junior Athletics Championships.

He holds personal bests of 1:46.36 minutes for the 800 metres and 3:40.47 minutes for the 1500 metres. He is a seven-time national champion, winning the 800 m in 2004, an 800/1500 m double in 2005 and 2006, another 800 m title in 2008, and a 1500 m title in 2014.

International competitions

National titles
Ugandan Athletics Championships
800 m: 2004, 2005, 2006, 2008
1500 m: 2005, 2006, 2014

References

External links
 

1987 births
Living people
People from Lira District
Ugandan male middle-distance runners
Commonwealth Games competitors for Uganda
Athletes (track and field) at the 2006 Commonwealth Games
Athletes (track and field) at the 2010 Commonwealth Games
African Games competitors for Uganda
Athletes (track and field) at the 2007 All-Africa Games
Athletes (track and field) at the 2015 African Games